"Something to Hold on To" is a song by Trevor Rabin.

It may also refer to:

 Something to Hold Onto, album by Saving Jane
 "Something to Hold on To" (Emily Warren song)
 "Something to Hold On To" (Turnpike Troubadours song)
 "Something to Hold on To" (Bilal song)